Swimming at the 1988 Summer Paralympics consisted of 257 events.

Medal table

Participating nations

Medal summary

Men's events

Women's events

References 

 Swimming at the Seoul 1988 Paralympic Games

1988 Summer Paralympics events
1988
Paralympics